Jan Karwecki (2 January 1949 – 5 June 2019) was a Polish footballer who played as a goalkeeper.

Career
Born in Glinno, Karwecki played club football for Górnik Wałbrzych, Lech Poznań, Szombierki Bytom, Wisła Kraków and Cracovia.

He earned five caps for the Poland national team between 1974 and 1975.

Later life and death
Karwecki died in Kraków on 5 June 2019, aged 70.

References

1949 births
2019 deaths
Polish footballers
Poland international footballers
Górnik Wałbrzych players
Lech Poznań players
Szombierki Bytom players
Wisła Kraków players
MKS Cracovia (football) players
Ekstraklasa players
I liga players
Association football goalkeepers